Volusia County, Florida (located in central-east Florida), operates a system of county roads that serve all portions of the county. The Volusia County Public Works Department, Road and Bridge Division, is responsible for maintaining all of the Volusia County roads. Most of the county roads are city streets or rural roads.

The numbers and routes of all Florida highways are assigned by the Florida Department of Transportation (FDOT), while county road numbers are assigned by the counties, with guidance from FDOT. North-south routes are generally assigned odd numbers, while east-west routes are generally assigned even numbers.

List

References

 
County